The Big Ugly is a 2020 American action film directed by Scott Wiper, who wrote the screenplay with Paul Tarantino. The film story follows Malcolm McDowell as a London mob boss who sends a henchman Neelyn (Vinnie Jones) to West Virginia to set up a money laundering operation with an oilman (Ron Perlman). But Neelyn's girlfriend (Lenora Crichlow) disappears, and Neelyn is out for revenge. The film was released on July 24, 2020, and received mixed reviews from critics.

Plot
Harris is a London crime boss, with Neelyn as his main enforcer. They fly to West Virginia after Harris strikes a deal with an old and valued friend, an American oilman named Preston. Stakes are high with Preston genuinely concerned with keeping his operation environmentally clean. Contracts are signed and festivities are held. Preston’s son PJ is overconfident and behaves as though entitled to take a crack at any girl he sees. Late that night Neelyn's six-year girlfriend, Fiona, disappears. Neelyn refuses to leave for England without her and finds her dead with PJ as the main suspect.
Neelyn has to discard his ties with friends and family, risking the oil contract and the friendship between his boss and Preston, to find retribution and the truth.

Cast
 Vinnie Jones as Neelyn, an enforcer for Harris
 Malcolm McDowell as Harris, a British crime boss
 Ron Perlman as Preston, a local oil baron
 Nicholas Braun as Will, Preston's foreman
 Leven Rambin as Kara
 Lenora Crichlow as Fiona, Neelyn's girlfriend
 Brandon Sklenar as Junior, Preston's son
 Elyse Levesque as Jackie
 Bruce McGill as Milt, Preston's right-hand man

Production
Filming took place over six weeks in Morehead, Kentucky, Owingsville, Kentucky and Olive Hill, Kentucky during the summer of 2018. Wiper originally intended to shoot the film in his home state of Ohio, but could not receive the proper tax incentives to convince the producers. Perlman said he knew he would be starring in the film by the time he reached page 11 of the script.

Release 
The Big Ugly was released in limited theaters (mostly drive-ins) in the United States on July 24, 2020, and then made available via video-on-demand on July 31.

The film made $152,468 from 68 theaters in its opening weekend.

Reception
On Metacritic, the film has a weighted average score of 52 out of 100, based on seven critics, indicating "mixed or average reviews".

Leslie Felperin of The Guardian gave the film 2 out of 5 stars, saying that it "plays like several plots, genres and mood boards all mashed together, which makes the end result interesting but not entirely successful." Writing for Time Out, Phil de Semlyen also gave the film 2 out of 5 and wrote: "You can tell roughly where The Big Ugly is going right from those opening exchanges: people are going to get punched, booze will be slugged back, and there will be some lads' mag philosophising about blood oaths and the bonds of brotherhood. Then more people will be punched. Amid all this, female characters will stand around wondering why they're so one-dimensional."

References

External links
 

2020 films
American action films
Vertical Entertainment films
2020s English-language films
2020s American films
Films scored by Alex Heffes